The 1930 Wimbledon Championships took place on the outdoor grass courts at the All England Lawn Tennis and Croquet Club in Wimbledon, London, United Kingdom. The tournament was scheduled to run from Monday 23 June until Saturday 5 July 1930 but the men's doubles final was postponed to Monday 7 July to allow Wilmer Allison time to recuperate after his men's singles final. It was the 50th staging of the Wimbledon Championships, and the third Grand Slam tennis event of 1930. Bill Tilden and Helen Moody won the singles titles.

Champions

Men's singles

 Bill Tilden defeated  Wilmer Allison, 6–3, 9–7, 6–4

Women's singles

 Helen Moody defeated  Elizabeth Ryan, 6–2, 6–2

Men's doubles

 Wilmer Allison /  John Van Ryn defeated  John Doeg /  George Lott, 6–3, 6–3, 6–2

Women's doubles

 Helen Moody /  Elizabeth Ryan defeated  Edith Cross /  Sarah Palfrey, 6–2, 9–7

Mixed doubles

 Jack Crawford /  Elizabeth Ryan defeated  Daniel Prenn /  Hilde Krahwinkel, 6–1, 6–3

References

External links
 Official Wimbledon Championships website

 
Wimbledon Championships
Wimbledon Championships
Wimbledon Championships
Wimbledon Championships